The Democratic Union of Croats (DZH) is a political party in Serbia representing the Croat ethnic minority in the province of Vojvodina.

It was founded on July 25, 2007, and the party seat is in Subotica, Age Mamužića 5 Street. Chronologically, DZH was fourth party of Croats from Serbia and third that emerged from dissatisfied fractions of the Democratic Alliance of Croats in Vojvodina. Party President is Đorđe Čović (since November 9, 2007).

Participation in elections
On April 25, 2008, DZH signed an agreement with Hungarian Coalition, in which it supported Hungarian Coalition on Serbian parliamentary elections in 2008.

On Presidential Elections in Serbia in 2008, DZH appealed its members to support Boris Tadić in 2nd electoral round.

On Parliamentary Elections in the autonomous province of Vojvodina in 2008, DZH joined the list Zajedno za Vojvodinu - Nenad Čanak, led by League of Social Democrats of Vojvodina.

References 
 Radio-Subotica Tomislav Žigmanov: Nova stranka u vojvođanskih Hrvata – umnožavanje jala, June 25, 2007
 Radio-Subotica Slaven Bačić: Kronologija formiranja jedne partije, July 21, 2007
 Radio-Subotica Elementarna nepogoda, September 18, 2007
 Radio-Subotica DHZ objavila «Deklaraciju», December 19, 2007

External links 
 Demokratska zajednica Hrvata - DZH WEB Official pages
 Radio Subotica DZH: Prve izjave veleposlanika Kuprešaka - ohrabrenje za hrvatsku zajednicu, March 17, 2009

Croat political parties in Serbia
Croats of Vojvodina
Politics of Vojvodina
2007 establishments in Serbia